Yukon, Oklahoma's original Czech Hall was built in 1899 by early Czech settlers who were members of Sokol Karel Havliček Lodge and Western Fraternal Life Association Lodge Jan Žižka No. 67. That building was replaced by the current structure in 1925.

The Hall, also known as Bohemian Hall, was the focal point of Czech social and musical functions in Oklahoma. It was, and is, the site of traditional weddings, reunions, and family gatherings. Until 1940, it was also a performance site for Czech plays. 

It is best known for the Czech dances which have taken place every Saturday night since 1925. The Yukon Czech Festival is centered on the Hall on the first Saturday of each October.

The building is a national and state historic site, having been listed on the National Register of Historic Places in 1980.

It is located at 205 N. Czech Hall Road, at the intersection of N. Czech Hall Rd. and Silver Maple Drive in Yukon.

See also 
 ZCBJ Lodge No. 46

References

Most of the information for this article was obtained from HMdb.org.

External links
 
 HMdb.org

Clubhouses on the National Register of Historic Places in Oklahoma
Buildings and structures in Canadian County, Oklahoma
Czech-American culture in Oklahoma
Czech-Slovak Protective Society
Buildings and structures completed in 1925
National Register of Historic Places in Canadian County, Oklahoma